Ralph E. Wells (September 3, 1940 – August 2, 1968) was an American professional basketball player. He played for the Chicago Zephyrs in the National Basketball Association for three games during 1962–63 after a collegiate career at Northwestern University. He shot 0-for-7 in free throw attempts in his NBA career.

Wells also played for the Pittsburgh Rens in the American Basketball League before the league folded in December 1962. On August 1, 1968, Wells drowned.

References

1940 births
1968 deaths
American Basketball League (1961–62) players
American men's basketball players
Basketball players from Chicago
Chicago Zephyrs players
Guards (basketball)
Northwestern Wildcats men's basketball players
Undrafted National Basketball Association players
Deaths by drowning in the United States